The Mooring is a 2021 Mexican horror film directed by Tamae Garateguy and produced by Lemon Films under the banner Lemonster. The film's main plot follows Julieta a young woman who after casting a love spell under a co-worker she involuntarily unleashes the dark side of her recent boyfriend.
The film was distributed mainly as a streaming movie due to COVID-19 restrictions on Mexico, which lead to the film being acquired by Amazon Prime Video. Sterilized by Vadhir Derbez and Sofia Espinoza, the movie became one of the most-watched films in the streaming on Mexico during its weekend premiere.

Plot 
After visiting a market looking for magical powder for working prosperity, Julieta, a young woman, is convinced by her best friend Elena to buy magical love powder for herself even though she doesn't believe in magic. The next day she uses the powder on her co-worker, Daniel, to draw his attention to no avail. However, Elena receives an ascension, which leads her to believe it was thanks to the powder. That night both of them and the rest of their co-workers, including Daniel: celebrate Elena's ascension. Drunk and unsatisfied with the powder effects, Julieta convinces Elena to go back to the magical store for a more efficient love spell. In response, the store owner, Santera, performs a mooring in a pagan ritual. Magic seems successful as Daniel follows Julieta to her apartment after work, where they kiss and eventually sleep together.

At first, Julieta enjoys her newfound relationship with Daniel until he begins acting possessive and aggressive to the point he accuses her of flirting with one of their co-workers and suggests she should stay away from Elena. Eventually, Daniel insults her and starts a scene in the office that ends with him fired. Once Julieta returns to her apartment Daniel hits her and destroys her living room as he blames her for causing his unemployment.

Julieta remembers the warnings from Gabriela, a woman who dated Daniel before her who claims he is not what he appears, and tries to contact her only to discover she suffered an incident. Fearing for her safety Julieta (along with Elena) visits Santera to break the mooring, but she warns them she can't undo it. Elena suggests Julieta stay in the cabin of her family as a distraction. Even though Julieta accepts, both women are found by Daniel, who breaks in at night, forcing Julieta to knock him off, apparently killing him.

Julieta tells Elena police won't believe the circumstances of Daniel's demise, so they take his car and set it ablaze with him inside. Days later, Julieta tries to move on, but she hears and sees what appears to be Daniel's ghost now with burning scars, taunting and threatening her he will haunt her forever. At first, she thinks he might be a hallucination, but when she sees him killing one of his colleagues, Julieta confirms Daniel is somehow following even after death. News of the mysterious death spread between the rest of the workers, including Elena, then goes to Julieta's apartment to comfort her, who is now paranoid and nervous. Julieta tells Elena her current situation but, she doesn't believe her and tries to take her to a hospital, causing a violent and jealous Daniel to lift and toss her over the window, dying from the fall.

Alone and desperate, Julieta goes to Santana's store and begs for a solution for the mooring. Santana reveals she knows a deadly spell that can take her to the border of life and death, a place where Daniel will be waiting for her to drag her to be with him eternally. However, it will provide her with enough time for cutting the bond and break free if she successfully escapes before the fire of the ceremony extinguishes. Julieta performs the spell, taking her to a dimension where Daniel distracts her while trying to escape. Julieta cut off his wedding finger tied to Daniel's but she fails to break free before the ceremony's end, leaving her soul trapped with Daniel's forever.

Cast 
 Sofía Espinosa as Julieta
 Vadhir Derbez as Daniel
 Fabiola Guajardo as Elena
 Danae Reynaud as Karla
 Jorge Gallegos as Marin
 Marisela García as Santera
 Ana Lucia Robleda as Gabriela

Production 
The film is a co-production of Video Cine with Lemon Studios under its banner "Lemonster"; a subsidiary of the main studio focused exclusively on horror films. Vadhir Derbez a well-known Mexican comedian-actor took the role to diversify his filmography considering horror as a challenging genre film. Espinoza believes Garateguy blent horror with social commentaries as gender violence especially with actress Ana Lucia Robleda part who plays Gabriela, a woman victim of a violent relationship.

Principal photography began in mid-July 2019 and concluded around a month before the shooting of "El Mesero", another movie sterilized by Derbez.

Distribution 
The film was officially released on October 29, 2021, on Amazon Prime Video as an exclusive streaming title. Originally scheduled for a theatrical release in Mexico, the film was delayed due to COVID-19 pandemic restrictions before being bought by Prime Video that also acquired other movies from Lemon Films. Due to the acquisition, the film lacked promotion from marketing and critics alike.

References

External links 
 

2021 films
2021 horror films
Mexican horror films
Films set in Mexico
2020s Spanish-language films
2020s Mexican films